Heaven Knows is the debut album by Australian singer-songwriter Rick Price, released in July 1992 through Sony Music-Columbia. It peaked at No. 3 in Australia in July 1992 and spent 23 weeks in the ARIA top 40 chart, and was also successful internationally in numerous countries. The album spawned five singles, all of which charted on the ARIA charts, with its first two singles cracking the top ten. The second single and title track "Heaven Knows" also charted in many countries in Europe and Asia and won the APRA Award song of the year. The fourth single was a cover of The Left Banke hit Walk Away Renee.

There were three issues of the album including a U.S. release and a double deluxe-CD Australian Tour Pressing in 1993. The album features a duet with renowned singer Tina Arena.

Track listing
 CD
 "What's Wrong with That Girl" (P. Buckle, R. Price) - 4:08
 "Not a Day Goes By" (P. Reswick, R. Price, S. Werfel) - 4:17
 "A House Divided" (P. Reswick, R. Price, S. Werfel) - 4:22
 "Walk Away Renée" (B. Calilli, M, Brown, T. Sansone) - 4:26
 "Heaven Knows" (H. Field, R. Price) - 4:25
 "Church on Fire" (P. Reswick, R. Price, S. Werfel) - 4:52
 "Life Without You" (P. Reswick, R. Price, S. Werfel) - 3:43
 "Foollin' Myself" (H. Field, R. Price) - 3:44
 "Forever Me and You" (H. Field, P. Gleeson, R. Price) - 4:14
 "Fragile" (H. Field, R. Price) - 3:28

Deluxe edition

1993 re-release bonus disc
 "Listen to Your Heart"
 "If You Were My Baby"	
 "Wishin"	
 "We've Got Each Other"
 "Not a Day Goes By"  (Acoustic Version) 
 "Where Are You Now"

Personnel
 Rick Price – acoustic guitar, backing vocals
 Tina Arena – backing vocals
 Neil Stubenhaus – bass guitar
 John Robinson – drums, percussion
 Michael Thompson – guitar
 Jimmy "Z" Zavala – harmonica
 Frank Marocco – piano, accordion
 Claude Gaudette – piano, Hammond organ

Charts

Weekly charts

Year-end charts

Certifications

References

1992 debut albums
Rick Price albums
Sony Music Australia albums